Rewa Terminal railway station is a main railway station in Rewa district, Madhya Pradesh. Its code is REWA. It serves Rewa city. The station consists of two platforms. The station is terminal on Satna–Rewa branch line which is a  Howrah–Allahabad–Mumbai line.

Major trains

Rewanchal Express
Madan Mahal–Rewa Intercity Express
Rewa–Anand Vihar Superfast Express
Rajkot–Rewa Superfast Express
Vadodara–Rewa Mahamana Express
Nagpur–Rewa Superfast Express
Bilaspur–Rewa Express
Rewa–Dr. Ambedkar Nagar Express

References

Railway stations in Rewa district
Jabalpur railway division
Railway terminus in India
Transport in Rewa, Madhya Pradesh